Jackie Moore may refer to:

Jackie Moore (basketball) (born 1932), American professional basketball player
Jackie Moore (baseball) (born 1939), American baseball player, manager, and coach
Jackie Moore (singer) (1946–2019), American R&B singer
Jacqueline Moore (born 1964), American actress and professional wrestler
Jacqueline S. Moore (1926–2002), American poet
Jackie Moore, stage name of Dora Nicolosi (née Carofiglio), singer of Valerie Dore and Novecento

See also
John Moore (disambiguation)